BAX Global was an American international shipping company that was headquartered in Irvine, California, and had other major offices in Australia, Singapore, London, the Netherlands and Toledo, Ohio.  The company was founded in 1971 also operated an airline. After having been acquired by DB Logistics in January 2006, Bax Global was integrated with Schenker, the land, sea, and air freight branch of DB Logistics.  DB Logistics is the freight and logistics division of Deutsche Bahn, the State-owned German railway company. In July 2011 Schenker Inc. announced it would give up its airfreight activities and stop the use of the remaining 20 aircraft.

History
The company originally opened for business in ten cities in the United States on June 15, 1972, as Burlington Northern Airfreight, Inc. (BNAFI), a subsidiary of Burlington Northern Railroad. In 1982, BNAFI was acquired by the Pittston Company, which later became Brink's. In 1986, BNAFI changed its name to Burlington Air Express, repositioning itself as an overnight air express company. The company acquired WTC Air Freight in 1987 and the assets of failed air freight carrier Roadway Global Air from Caliber System in 1995. In 1997 the company changed its name to BAX Global, reflecting its expansion over all continents.

On January 31, 2006, BAX Global was acquired from Brink's by DB Logistics, the Transportation and Logistics Division of Deutsche Bahn, for $1.1 billion.

Burlington Air Express had a dedicated fleet of aircraft owned and operated by Air Transport International (ATI), a sister company also owned by Brinks. At the time of the sale of BAX Global to DB Logistics, ATI was sold to Cargo Holdings International.  Cargo Holdings International is still under contract with BAX Global to provide dedicated lift.

In July 2011, Schenker Inc. (DB Schenker Logistics) announced it would give up its domestic airfreight activities in the US, Canada and Mexico and therefore would stop using the remaining fleet of 20 aircraft in the coming week as cargo had begun to be moved by trucks. This decision affected 700 employees and represented 10% of the Schenker Inc. business in this area.

Former fleet 
(before acquisition)
 18 Douglas DC-8F
 10 Boeing 727-200F
 Several Boeing 747 for international charters

See also 
 List of defunct airlines of the United States

References

External links 

 Schenker, Inc.
 old BAX Global web page

Logistics companies of the United States
Airlines based in California
Defunct airlines of the United States
Cargo airlines of the United States
Companies based in Irvine, California
Transportation companies based in California
Airlines established in 1997
Airlines disestablished in 2011